Margaret Balfour (1889 – January 1961) was an English classical contralto of the 1920s and 1930s.  She is best remembered as the angel in Elgar's own recorded excerpts of The Dream of Gerontius (1927) and one of the 16 soloists in the original performance of Vaughan Williams's Serenade to Music (1938).

She was also recorded by HMV singing Bach's Mass in B Minor with Elisabeth Schumann and the London Symphony Orchestra conducted by Albert Coates in sessions in 1929 at Kingsway Hall, London. She sang in the St Matthew Passion in November 1929 (with Keith Falkner and Elsie Suddaby) at Westminster with the Bach Cantata Club under Charles Kennedy Scott. She sang in Beethoven's Symphony No. 9 with the BBC Choral Society and the BBC Symphony Orchestra conducted by Arturo Toscanini at the Queen's Hall, London, on 22 May 1939. She was a soloist at the Handel Festival conducted by Sir Henry Wood at Alexandra Palace in 1939.

Sources
UK Civil Registration Index
Olson, Ruth. '[STUDLEY] Re: Roll call ', Rootsweb.com STUDLEY-L Archives, (December 15, 2000) Retrieved April 12, 2005
Barwell, Ivan. "The Finest Concert Organ in Europe" : A Brief History of The Willis Concert Organ at the Alexandra Palace (London, 1993)
Date of death
Music Web International
Wellington Choral Society

References

1961 deaths
Operatic mezzo-sopranos
English opera singers
1889 births